The following is a comprehensive discography of Sparks, an American rock and pop music band formed in Los Angeles in 1970 by brothers Ron (keyboards) and Russell Mael (vocals), initially under the name Halfnelson. Best known for their quirky approach to songwriting, Sparks' music is often accompanied by cutting and acerbic lyrics, and an idiosyncratic stage presence, typified in the contrast between Russell's wide-eyed hyperactive frontman antics and Ron's sedentary scowling.

Albums

Studio albums

Live albums

Soundtrack albums

Compilation albums
 2 Originals of Sparks (1975, Bearsville) - Double LP set consisting of Halfnelson and A Woofer in Tweeter's Clothing
 The Best of Sparks (1978, Island Records)
 The History of the Sparks (1981, Carrere)
 Mael Intuition (The Best of the Sparks 1974-76) (1990, Island)
 Profile: The Ultimate Sparks Collection (1991, Rhino)
 The Heaven Collection (1993, Underdog/Sony France)
 The Hell Collection (1993, Underdog/Sony France)
 In the Swing (1993, Spectrum/Karussell)
 The 12 Inch Mixes (1996, Kiosk)
 12" Mixes (1999, Oglio Records)
 The Best of Sparks (2000, Repertoire Records)
 This Album's Big Enough… The Best of Sparks (2002, Music Club)
 Shortcuts – The 7inch Mixes (1979-1984) (2012, Repertoire Records)
 Extended – The 12inch Mixes (1979-1984) (2012, Repertoire Records)
 Real Extended: The 12 inch Mixes (1979 - 1984) (2012, Repertoire Records) Improved and Corrected Version of above
 New Music for Amnesiacs: The Essential Collection (2013, Lil Beethoven Records)
 The Best & The Rest Of The Island Years 74-78 (2018, Island Records, 2 (Limited Edition, Remastered, Red Translucent) Vinyle LP)
 Past Tense – The Best of Sparks (2019, BMG Rights Management UK) SC #23, UK #73

Singles

1970s

1980s

1990s–present

Collaborations and contributions
1979 - produced and wrote an album called Is There More to Life Than Dancing? for a singer named Noël.
1979 - produced the album Pas Dormir for a French band Bijou.
1979 - produced the single "C’est Sheep" by Adrian Munsey.
1981 - wrote the lyrics for the album Sex by Telex.
1982 - worked with Lio on her album Suite Sixtine, which was a compilation of French rarities and English versions (translated by Sparks) of tracks from her first album.
1984 - co-wrote a song called "Yes or No" for The Go-Go's album Talk Show.
1987 - Russell Mael provided backing vocals for Salon Music for This Is Salon Music.
1988 - "In My Life" and "Say Hello, Wave Goodbye" with Salon Music for O Boy.
1988 - "Singing in the Shower", "Live in Las Vegas" and "Hip Kit" with Les Rita Mitsouko from Marc et Robert.
2001 - "Kimono" with Pizzicato Five from Çà et là du Japon.
2001 - "La nuit est là" and "Yo quiero màs dinero" with Grand Popo Football Club from Shampoo Victims.
2003 - "We Are The Clash", a cover for Uncut magazine's The Clash tribute CDs "White Riot"
2004 - "Acid Pants" with Orbital from Blue Album.
2005 - remixed Morrissey's song, "Suedehead", for the compilation Future Retro
2010 - remixed the song "Give Me Something" by Yoko Ono
2011 - remixed the song "A Happy Place" by Katie Melua as Sparks Vs Katie Melua
2012 - produced Gemma Ray's cover versions of Sparks songs "How Do I Get to Carnegie Hall" and "Eaten by the Monster of Love"
2021 - recorded "Your Fandango" with Todd Rundgren

Soundtrack appearances
Rollercoaster (1977) - "Big Boy" and "Fill 'Er Up"
Valley Girl (1983) - "Angst in My Pants" and "Eaten by the Monster of Love"
Get Crazy (1983) - "Get Crazy"
Where the Boys Are '84 (1984) - "Mini-Skirted"
Heavenly Bodies (1984) - "Breaking Out of Prison"
Bad Manners (aka Growing Pains) (1984) - "Growing Pains", "Motorcycle Midget", "What You're Wearing" (with Laurie Bell) and "Growing Pains (Reprise)"
Fright Night (1985) - "The Armies of the Night"
Rad (1986) - "Music That You Can Dance To"
Black Rain (1989) - "Singing in the Shower"
Unlawful Entry (1992) - "National Crime Awareness Week"
Knock Off (1998) - Original Musical Score and "It's a Knockoff"
Boarding Gate - "The Number One Song in Heaven"
Rendition - "Camel Jam" and "Nous-Nous"
Cabin Fever 2: Spring Fever (2009) - "Eaten by the Monster of Love"
Kick Ass (2010) - "This Town Ain't Big Enough for Both of Us"
Alan Partridge: Alpha Papa (2013) - "The Number One Song in Heaven"
The Overnight (2015) - "Tryouts for the Human Race"
Master of None - "Tryouts for the Human Race"
A Futile and Stupid Gesture (2018) - "Beat the Clock"

Video
Amateur Hour (V-CD, 1995)
Live in London (2003)
Lil' Beethoven - Live In Stockholm (2004)
DEE VEE DEE - Live at the London Forum (2007)

Music videos

Notes

References

Rock music group discographies
Pop music group discographies
Discographies of American artists